Carlos Pedro Carvalho Sousa (born 30 June 1985 in Felgueiras, Porto District), known as Pintassilgo, is a Portuguese former professional footballer who played as a midfielder.

References

External links

1985 births
Living people
People from Felgueiras
Sportspeople from Porto District
Portuguese footballers
Association football midfielders
Primeira Liga players
Liga Portugal 2 players
Segunda Divisão players
F.C. Felgueiras players
Vitória S.C. players
Moreirense F.C. players
Portimonense S.C. players
F.C. Arouca players
S.C. Covilhã players
Varzim S.C. players
F.C. Felgueiras 1932 players
Liga I players
CS Pandurii Târgu Jiu players
Portuguese expatriate footballers
Expatriate footballers in Romania
Portuguese expatriate sportspeople in Romania